João Parvi (Latin: Ioannes Parvi or Ioannes Pettit), also known as D. João de Évora (1480 - 29 November 1546) was a French-Portuguese prelate.

Biography

Parvi was born in the Diocese of Bayonne in Aquitaine in the southwest of France under the name Jean Petit, he became a naturalized Portuguese citizen under John III of Portugal.

He was documented as a teacher in 1520 at the University of Lisbon as General Studies.  He was a part of a humanist group at the University of Évora.

Ecclesiastical career
He was member at the prestige See of Évora which was used as an archdeacon and a canon magistrate.

As contemporary of Martin of Portugal who had been sent to the Papal States in Rome for the creation of Dioceses of Anga, Cape Verde, São Tomė and Goa, in which he had influence in its school.

On 23 September 1538, he became the second Bishop of Cape Verde.  He succeeded Brás Neto who was in Lisbon and did not fully became an archbishop.

Also on 23 September 1538, he headed to the Roman Curia.  However he went to reside for the bishop's seat, heremained in his estate in Évora up to 1545.  In September, he made a will, he left his heir to his nephew Reginaldo Parvi, on that document, he was going to the island of Santiago in Cape Verde, probably at the end of 1545, where he became the first bishop resident.

Death
He died in Ribeira Grande on 29 December 1546, having served only a year on the episcopate.  A sepulcher was put at the Nossa Senhora do Rosário (Our Lady of Rosary) church in Ribeira Grande  He was succeeded by bishop Francisco da Cruz.

About a 120 years later, Manuel Severim da Faria commented an apologetic latter that D. Joāo Parvi was a sacrifice to church service.

References

External links
Photographs of his tomb of João Parvi, at Arquipelagos electronic website 

1480 births
1546 deaths
People from Bayonne
16th-century Roman Catholic bishops in Portugal
Roman Catholic bishops of Santiago de Cabo Verde